Gerald Dawe (born 1952) is an Irish poet.

Early life
Gerald Dawe was born in Belfast, Northern Ireland and grew up with his mother, sister and grandmother. He attended Orangefield High School across the city in East Belfast, a leading progressive liberal state school. He was later involved in the Lyric Youth Theatre under inspirational teacher and theatre director, Sam McCready. Around this time he started to write poems and after a brief period living in London, he returned to the North, receiving a B.A. (Hons) from the fledgling New University of Ulster (1974) where his professor was the left-wing literary critic and novelist, Walter Allen.

Dawe worked briefly as an assistant librarian at the Fine Arts department, in the Central Library in Belfast before being awarded a Major State Award for Postgraduate Research from the Dept. of Education, Northern Ireland. Dawe decided to attend University College Galway (UCG) and wrote his graduate thesis on the little-known 19th-century Tyrone novelist and short story writer, William Carleton. He also started to lecture in the Dept. of English at UCG (now known as the National University of Ireland, Galway). His first full collection, Sheltering Places, was published in 1978, receiving two years later, a Bursary for Poetry from the Arts Council of Ireland.

Later life and work
In Galway, he met Dorothea Melvin, his future wife, and settled in east Galway with his family – Iarla and Olwen. His second collection, The Lundys Letter, was published in 1985 and was awarded the prestigious Macaulay Fellowship in Literature. The collection was concerned with the cultural and social roots of his background in Belfast and of the different Northern Irish and emigre histories of his own family, highlighted by his new life in the west of Ireland.

His subsequent volumes, Sunday School (1991) and Heart of Hearts (1995) developed and deepened this exploration of the cultural diversity of Northern Ireland's cultural inheritance as seen through the lifestyle and customs of one family. In 1988 he was appointed Lecturer in English at Trinity College Dublin and for the next five years commuted between his home in Galway and work in Dublin before the family moved to Dublin in 1992.

Dawe was appointed a Fellow of Trinity College Dublin in 2004 and was Professor in English and the inaugural director of the Oscar Wilde Centre for Irish Writing(1997-2015). He retired from Trinity College Dublin in 2017. He has also held visiting professorships at Boston College and Villanova University in the US as well as receiving International Writers' Fellowships from Hawthorden (UK) and Ledig Roholt foundation in Switzerland. His subsequent collections – The Morning Train (1999), Lake Geneva (2003) and Points West (2008) – mark an important departure from the Irish settings and primary concerns of his earlier work and established Dawe as a significant European poet in both range and reference, confirmed by the publication of Selected Poems (2012). and, most recently, 'Mickey Finn's Air' (2014).

He has given numerous readings and lectures in many parts of the world and during the political upheavals in former East Europe was a regular contributor to festivals and conferences organised by The British Council, among others. A volume of his selected poems appeared in German in 2007 and he has also been translated into French, Italian, Spanish and Japanese, while he co-translated into English the early poems of the Sicilian poet and Nobel laureate, Salvatore Quasimodo. 

Dawe has published extensively on Irish poetry and cultural issues, much of which is collected in his prose works: The Proper Word: Collected Criticism,'Of War and War's Alarms: Reflections on Modern Irish Writing' (2015), 'In Another World: Van Morrison & Belfast (2017) and The Wrong Country: Essays on Modern Irish Writing (2018). He has lived for many years in County Dublin with his wife, Dorothea, who was chairperson of the Irish-British 'think-tank', Encounter, director of the cultural resource body, Cultures of Ireland and head of public affairs at Ireland's national theatre, The Abbey, during the late 1990s and is currently a board member of the Irish Association.

Critical perspective
Richard Ford, the leading American novelist described Dawe's latest collection, Mickey Finn's Air (2014) in the following terms:
‘The poems, as a finely-made book ought, compose a kind of sinuous, un-dogmatic “answer” to the conjoined perplexities of the museum-catalog which is our memory, and of loss, and love, and our insubstantial self-knowledge.  And flight.  All of that in conflict with the wholly opposite urge: which is, to make life somehow stop-and-be-savored, make its sweet serenade audible, before it's too late.  These are large concerns. And they are never ponderously set-in here.  Indeed, finding these “variously contending discourses” present in the music of these poems, provides a sort of blesséd relief, as they come round and accumulate, and reward Seamus Heaney's injunction that a poem's reason for being is to provide “the stability conferred by a musically satisfying order of sounds.”  Again, when you come to the end of this book you feel that something important has been stabilized – and beautifully – and asks our assent. these 20 poems both embody but also reconcile with their own “airs” – perfectly accessible, even conversational, with cunning interior rhymes, and deftly-encrypted structures that please without baffling or showing off—their diction so finely installed as to be noticeable only after the fact, which entices us to re-reading, and deepening our confidence that our attention's being masterfully superintended. Some of these poems are laments.  But as with any lament, its double nature pleases as it sorrows... the sweet, interior music and the pull of lived life that so invigorates Mickey Finn's Air’.

Commentary
 John Brown. "In the Chair" Salmon Publishing 2000
 An Sionnach: A Journal of Literature, and the Arts, "A Special Issue dedicated to the work of Gerald Dawe", 3:1 (Spring 2007)
 Nicholas Allen. "Introduction", Gerald Dawe, The Proper Word: Ireland, Poetry, Politics (2007)
 Stan Smith. Something Misplaced: Gerald Dawe, Irish Poetry and the Construction of Modern Identity (2005)
 Cathal Dallat. "Mapping the Territory", The Guardian (UK) 18 October 2003
 Katrina Goldstone. "Twilight Zones", Irish Studies Review (May 2005)
 Jonathan Ellis. "Out of Time", Metre (Winter 2001/02)
 Special collections: John J. Burns Library, Boston College

Bibliography

Poetry
 Sheltering Places (1978)
 The Lundys Letter (1985)
 Sunday School (1991)
 Heart of Hearts (1995)
 The Morning Train (1999)
 Lake Geneva (2003)
 Points West (2008)
 Selected Poems (2012)
  "Mickey Finn's Air"(2014)
  "Early Poems" (2015)

Essays
 The Proper Word: Ireland, Poetry, Politics (2007)
 Of War and War's Alarms: Reflections on Modern Irish Writing (2015)
 In Another World: Van Morrison & Belfast (2017)
 The Wrong Country: Essays on Modern Irish Writing (2018)

As editor
 The Younger Irish Poets (1982)
 The New Younger Irish Poets (1991)
 Yeats: The Poems, a new selection (1991)
 Earth Voices Whispering: Irish poetry of war, 1914–1945 (2008)
 The Cambridge Companion to Irish Poets (2018)

As Co-editor
 Across a Roaring Hill: the Protestant Imagination in Modern Ireland
with Edna Longley (1985)
 The Poet's Place: Essays on Ulster Literature & Society
with John Wilson Foster (1991)
 Ruined Pages: Selected Poems of Padraic Fiacc
with Aodan Mac Poilin (1994; new edition 2011)
Krino: the Review, 1986–1996, an anthology of modern Irish writing 
with Jonathan Williams (1996)
 The Ogham Stone: an anthology of modern Ireland 
with Michael Mulreany (2001)
The Writer Fellow with Terence Brown (2004)
High Pop: the Irish Times column of Stewart Parker
with Maria Johnston (2008)
 Dramatis Personae and other writings by Stewart Parker
with Maria Johnston and Clare Wallace (2008)
The Night Fountain: Selected early poems of Salvatore Quasimodo
with Marco Sonzogni (2008)
Heroic Heart: A Charles Donnelly Reader
with Kay Donnelly (2011)
Ruined Pages: New Selected Poems of Padraic Fiacc
with Aodan Mac Poilin (2012)
Beautiful Strangers:Ireland & the world of the Fifties
with Darryl Jones and Nora Pelazzi (2012)

Prizes and awards
 1974-77: Major State Award (Northern Ireland Department of Education)
 1980: Arts Council of Ireland Bursary for Poetry
 1984: Macaulay Fellowship in Literature for The Lundys Letter
 1987: Hawthorden International Writers Fellowship (UK)
 1999: Ledig-Rowholt International Writers Fellowship (Switzerland)
 2000: Arts Council of Ireland Bursary for Poetry

Distinctions
 2004: Fellow, Trinity College Dublin
 2005: J.J. Burns Visiting Professor, Boston College
 2009: Heimbold Chair, Irish Studies, Villanova University, Philadelphia
 2013: The Moore Institute Fellowship, NUI, Galway
 2016-17: Visiting Scholar, Pembroke College, Cambridge (UK)

Recent interviews
 2014: Andrea Rea http://www.drb.ie/essays/good-remembering
 2015: Dave Lourdan http://humag.co/features/gerald-dawe
 2015: Philip Coleman http://www.icarusmagazine.com/may-2015/2015/9/19/featured-a-conversation-between-gerald-dawe-and-philip-coleman 
 2016: https://www.tcd.ie/trinitywriters/writers/gerald-dawe/
 2016: Eleanor Doorley  http://thelonelycrowd.org/2016/09/26/balancing-acts-gerald-dawe-in-conversation-with-eleanor-doorley/

References

External links
 Website
 The Poet's Chair (Irish Poets)

1952 births
Living people
Academics of the University of Galway
Alumni of Ulster University
Male poets from Northern Ireland
Academics of Trinity College Dublin
Writers from Belfast
Male writers from Northern Ireland
Alumni of the University of Galway